New Zealand competed at the 2018 Winter Paralympics in PyeongChang, South Korea, with a team of three athletes competing in two sports.

Medallists

Events

Alpine skiing

Men's

Snowboarding

Men's
Banked slalom

Cross

See also
New Zealand at the 2018 Winter Olympics

References

Nations at the 2018 Winter Paralympics
2018
Winter Paralympics